The 1918 Buffalo Bisons football team was an American football team that represented the University at Buffalo as an independent during the 1918 college football season. In its third season under head coach Art Powell, the team compiled a 6–1 record, shut out four of seven opponents, and outscored all opponents by a total of 234 to 40.

Schedule

References

Buffalo
Buffalo Bulls football seasons
Buffalo Bisons football